Philipp Kohlschreiber was the defending champion but lost in the final to Tommy Haas, 3–6, 6–7(3–7).

Seeds
The top four seeds receive a bye into the second round.

Draw

Finals

Top half

Bottom half

Qualifying

Seeds

Qualifiers

Lucky losers
  Sergiy Stakhovsky

Draw

First qualifier

Second qualifier

Third qualifier

Fourth qualifier

References
 Main Draw
 Qualifying Draw

BMW Open - Singles
2013 BMW Open